Lecithocera leucotella is a moth in the family Lecithoceridae. It was described by Francis Walker in 1864. It is found on Borneo.

Adults are dark cupreous, the forewings with three irregular dark metallic-blue bands and with a silvery white point near the tip of the costa. The fringe is silvery white, except towards the interior border. The hindwings have a broad abbreviated irregular semihyaline (almost glasslike) white stripe.

References

Moths described in 1864
leucotella